Kahramaa (Qatar General Electricity and Water Corporation), was established in July 2000 to regulate and maintain the supply of electricity and water for the population of Qatar. Since inception, Kahramaa has operated as an independent corporation on a commercial basis with a total capital of eight billion Qatari riyals. Kahramaa is the sole transmission and distribution system owner and operator for the electricity and water sector in Qatar.

History
During Qatar's years as a British protectorate in the 20th century, water and electricity was regulated by the British under two separate entities known as the State Electricity Department and the State Water Department. After the British announced their plans of withdrawing from the country in 1968, the state established the Ministry of Electricity and Water to regulate its electricity and water needs. In July 2000, the Qatar General Electricity and Water Corporation (Kahramaa) was established by emiri decree in order to regulate and maintain the supply of water and electricity for the Qatari population.

Operations
In August 2015, the company announced that it would begin construction of Umm al Houl Power, a desalination and power plant in the south of the country. The plant started its operations from July 2018.

Qatar's first major solar power plant was announced by Kahramaa in 2014, and was slated to begin operations by 2016. Its production capacity is expected to be 15 MW. In December 2015, the company stated that it had signed an agreement with QatarEnergy for cooperation in the development of solar power plants. Kahramaa would retain 60% ownership of the plants constructed under the agreement, while QatarEnergy would retain the remaining 40%.

Electricity sector

As of 2011, the electricity transmission networks consist of approximately 247 primary high voltage sub-stations. The network is coupled with 10500 low and medium voltage sub-stations (11 kV). The National Control Center manages all network demand and data acquisition from generation plants and primary sub-stations.

Electricity generation

Generation of electrical energy in Qatar has increased over the past fifty years; the maximum load over the network during the period from 1988 to 2003 has risen from 941 MW to 2,312 MW. It reached 3,230 MW in 2006. By 2011, it had increased to 6,518 MW. The company was producing around 8,600 MW by 2014; a 2,000 MW surplus when compared to the 6,600 MW of demand. By 2020, the demand had risen to 8600 MW.

Electricity generation capacity
Kahramaa's electricity generation capacity was 28,144 GWh in 2010. This figure increased to 30,730 GWh in 2011 and 34,788 GWh in 2012 before dropping slightly, to 34,688 GWh in 2013. Another large expansion was recorded in 2014, when the electricity production capacity was raised to 38,963 GWh. Overall, from 2010 to 2014, Kahramaa's electricity generation capacity was increased at an average annual rate of around 10%.

Water sector

Water capacities

Statistical data in the water sector shows a remarkable growth in the capacities of water storage facilities.

Water quality

To ensure safe and clean drinking water to high standards and quality, water is subject to daily random bacteriological and laboratory tests undertaken by Kahramaa. Samples are collected and tested from the storage reservoirs and networks up to the customers' storage facilities.

References

External links

 

Electric power companies of Qatar
Energy companies established in 2000
Water in Qatar
Companies based in Doha
Qatari companies established in 2000